The extreme points of Ethiopia include the coordinates that are further north, south, east or west than any other location in Ethiopia; and the highest and the lowest elevations in the country.

Latitude and longitude 
 Northernmost point: 
 bend in the Mareb River, Tigray Region
 Southernmost point: unnamed location on the border with Kenya near a hill immediately east of the Kenyan town of Moyale, Somali Region
 Easternmost point: the point of the triangular section of the Somali border; 
 Somali Region
 Westernmost point: 
 bend in the Pibor River opposite the South Sudanese village of Denjok, Gambela Region

Elevation 
 Highest point:
 Ras Dejen, Semien Mountains, in the Amhara Region 
 Lowest point:
 Afar Depression, in the Afar Region

See also 
 Geography of Ethiopia
 Extreme points of Africa

Ethiopia
Geography of Ethiopia